The New Rochelle Walk of Fame was installed in 2011 in Ruby Dee Park at Library Green, located in the downtown area of New Rochelle in Westchester County, New York. The "walk" is a tribute to some of New Rochelle's most notable residents from throughout its 325-year history. It was created and funded by former resident Roderick Kennedy, Jr., working in partnership with the City of New Rochelle and the New Rochelle Business Improvement District.

Inductees
The following is the list of the individuals recognized in New Rochelle's "Walk of Fame."

Beatrice Alexander (1895–1990): Premier doll maker of the 20th century
Robert Allen (1928–2000): Music Composer; There's no Place Like Home for the Holidays
Jerry Bock (1928–2010): Musical theater composer; Fiddler on the Roof
Theresa Brewer (1932–2007): Singer and entertainer
Nell Brinkley (1886–1944): Illustrator, cartoonist; the "Queen of Comics"
Joseph Campbell (1904–1987): Writer, mythologist; The Hero with a Thousand Faces
Irene Castle (1893–1969): Dancer and trend-setter (with Vernon Castle)
Carrie Chapman Catt (1859–1947): A leader of the women's suffrage movement
J. Fred Coots (1897–1985): Songwriter; Santa Claus is Coming to Town
Richard Courant (1888–1972): Mathematician; co-founder of the Courant Institute
Ellabelle Davis (1907–1960): Opera singer
Ossie Davis (1917–2005): Actor, author and activist
Ruby Dee (1924–2014): Actress, author and activist
E. L. Doctorow (1931–2015): Novelist, editor, professor; Ragtime
Eddie Foy (1856–1928): Vaudeville performer; Eddie Foy and The Seven Little Foys
Kurt Friedrichs (1901–1982): Mathematician; co-founder of the Courant Institute
Lou Gehrig (1903–1941): New York Yankee baseball player and first baseman
Dorothy Gish (1989–1968): Screen and stage actress
Lillian Gish (1893–1993): Screen and stage actress, director
Barry Gray (1916–1996): Radio personality; "The Father of Talk Radio"
Monty Hall (born 1921): Game show host; Let's Make a Deal
Henry J. Heimlich (1920–2016): Physician and developer of the "Heimlich Maneuver"
Don Hewitt (1922–2009): Television news producer; created 60 Minutes
Adrian G Iselin (1818–1905): Financier and philanthropist
Elia Kazan (1909–2003): Director, producer, writer and actor
Walter Lantz (1899–1994): Cartoonist, film animator; created Woody Woodpecker
Jay Leno (born 1950): Comedian; hosted The Tonight Show
Joseph Leyendecker (1874–1951): Artist and illustrator
Reginald Marsh (1898–1954): Artist; known for his social realist paintings of New York City life
Willie Mays (born 1931): NY and San Francisco Giants center fielder
Don McLean (born 1946): Singer-songwriter, writer of "American Pie"
Alan Menken (born 1949): Disney film score and musical theater composer
Robert Merrill (1917–2004): Opera singer
Thomas Paine (1737–1809): Writer, revolutionary, philosopher; American Founding Father
Frederick Douglass Patterson (1901–1988): Educator: founded the United Negro College Fund
Jan Peerce (1904–1984): Opera singer
Pearl Primus (1919–1994): Dancer and choreographer
Alex Raymond (1909–1956): Comic strip artist; created Flash Gordon
Carl Reiner (born 1922): Comedian, actor, writer and director; The Dick Van Dyke Show
Rob Reiner (born 1947): Actor, writer, director, producer; All in the Family
Frederic Remington (1861–1909): Artist of the American West
Mariano Rivera (born 1969): New York Yankees baseball pitcher
Norman Rockwell (1894–1978): Artist and illustrator
Richard Roundtree (born 1942): Actor; Shaft
Elizabeth Ann Bayley Seton (1774–1821): The first American-born woman to become a saint 
Robert E. Sherwood (1896–1955): Playwright, editor, screenwriter; The Best Years of Our Lives
Buffalo Bob Smith (1917–1998): Radio and TV personality; hosted the Howdy Doody Show
John Starin (1825–1909): Congressman, shipping magnet; created Glen Island Park
Joseph Stein (1912–2010): Playwright; Fiddler on the Roof
John Stephenson (1809–1893): Coachbuilder; invented the streetcar
Frances Sternhagen (born 1930): Stage, television and screen actress
Paul Terry (1887–1971): Cartoonist, founded Terrytoons; created Mighty Mouse
Edwin Thanhouser (1865–1956): Film producer; co-founded Thanhouser Films
Gertrude Thanhouser (1882–1951): Actress, studio executive; co-founded Thanhouser Films
Claire Trevor (1910–2000): Actress; "The Queen of Film Noir"
Whitney M. Young, Jr. (1921–1971): Educator, Civil Rights leader; founded the Urban League

 New Rochelle in the NFL 
Courtney Greene (born 1986): Safety; Seattle Seahawks and Jacksonville Jaguars
Fritz Pollard (1894–1986): First African-American head coach and player in NFL
Ray Rice (born 1987): Running Back; Baltimore Ravens
Kyle Rote (1928–2002): Halfback and wide receiver; New York Giants
Matt Snell (born 1941): Running back; New York Jets
George Starke (born 1948): Offensive Lineman; Washington Redskins
Fran Tarkenton (born 1940): Quarterback; Minnesota Vikings and New York Giants

References

External links
 "Walk of Fame" – Facebook page

Culture of New Rochelle, New York
Walks of fame
Halls of fame in New York (state)
2011 establishments in New York (state)